Nouna  is a department or commune of Kossi Province in western Burkina Faso. Its capital is the town of Nouna. According to the 2019 census the department has a total population of 89,718.

Towns and villages

Nouna (32,428 inhabitants) (capital)
Aourèma (363)
Babekolon (656)
Bagala (1,252)
Bankoumani (1,646)
Bare (1,273)
Bisso (503)
Bonkuy (69)
Boron (612)
Damandigui (472)
Dantiéra (384)
Dara (2,335)
Dembelela (433)
Dembo (1,728)
Digani (1,532)
Dina (167)
Diondougou (164)
Dionkongo (876)
Farakuy (427)
Kaki (1,259)
Kansara (601)
Karekuy (361)
Kalfadougou (560)
Kemena (2,179)
Kerena (712)
Kombara (1,093)
Konankoira (1,670)
Konkuini (314)
Kononiba (398)
Koredougou (165)
Koro (2,612)
Lei (378)
Mani (781)
Moinsi (75)
Mourdie (1,474)
Niankuy (227)
Ouette (1,502)
Pa (1,086)
Patiarakuy (293)
Saint-Jean (484)
Saint-Louis (998)
Sampopo (755)
Seré (1,041)
Seriba (1,216)
Sien (192)
Simbadougou (1,076)
Soa (768)
Sobon (1,086)
Soin (1,078)
Sokoro (902)
Solimana (1,822)
Tébéré (563)
Tenou (1,486)
Thia (147)
Tissi (887)
Tombodougou (806)
Toni (1,940)
Tonkoroni (262)
Tonseré (395)
Zoun (505)

References

Departments of Burkina Faso
Kossi Province